Megaloprotachne is a genus of African plants in the grass family. The only known species is Megaloprotachne albescens, native to Angola, Zambia, Zimbabwe, Botswana, Namibia, and South Africa (Northern Cape, North West, and Limpopo)

References

Panicoideae
Grasses of Africa
Grasses of South Africa
Flora of Southern Africa
Flora of South Tropical Africa
Monotypic Poaceae genera
Taxa named by Charles Edward Hubbard